This article lists the squads for the 2014 Cyprus Women's Cup, the 7th edition of the Cyprus Women's Cup. The cup consisted of a series of friendly games, and was held in Cyprus from 5 to 12 March 2014. The twelve national teams involved in the tournament registered a squad of 23 players.

The age listed for each player is on 5 March 2014, the first day of the tournament. The numbers of caps and goals listed for each player do not include any matches played after the start of tournament. The club listed is the club for which the player last played a competitive match prior to the tournament. The nationality for each club reflects the national association (not the league) to which the club is affiliated. A flag is included for coaches that are of a different nationality than their own national team.

Group A

Canada
Coach:  John Herdman

The squad was announced on 24 February 2014. On 4 March 2014, Lauren Sesselmann suffered a cruciate ligament injury in training and withdrew from the squad, and two days later was replaced by Rebecca Quinn.

England
Coach:  Mark Sampson

The squad was announced on 12 February 2014. On 26 February, Karen Bardsley and Rachel Brown-Finnis withdrew due to injuries and were replaced by Lizzie Durack and Carly Telford.

Finland
Coach:  Andrée Jeglertz

Italy
Coach: Antonio Cabrini

The squad was announced on 24 February 2014. Valentina Cernoia withdrew from the squad and was replaced by Marta Carissimi.

Group B

Australia
Coach:  Hesterine de Reus

The squad was announced on 24 February 2014.

France
Coach: Philippe Bergeroo

Netherlands
Coach: Roger Reijners

Scotland
Coach:  Anna Signeul

The squad was announced on 25 February 2014. Megan Sneddon and Heather Richards were later added to the squad.

Group C

Ireland
Coach: Susan Ronan

The squad was announced on 19 February 2014. Before travelling to Cyprus, Grace Moloney withdrew from the squad due to a back injury and was replaced by Emma Hansberry.

New Zealand
Coach:  Tony Readings

The squad was announced on 26 February 2014.

South Korea
Coach: Yoon Deok-yeo

The squad was announced on 20 February 2014. Four days later, Kim Do-yeon withdrew and was replaced by Ahn Hye-in.

Switzerland
Coach:  Martina Voss-Tecklenburg

Player representation
Statistics are per the beginning of the competition.

By club
Clubs with 5 or more players represented are listed.

By club nationality

By club federation

By representatives of domestic league

References

2014